Calum Daniel Green (born 15 July 1990) is an English rugby union player. He plays lock for Leicester Tigers in Premiership Rugby.  He has previously played for Leicester Tigers between 2007 and 2012, as well as for Nottingham and Yorkshire Carnegie in the RFU Championship and featured in over 100 games for Newcastle Falcons between 2014 and 2019.

Green was a Premiership Rugby champion in 2022.

Club career
Green was dual-registered for Nottingham and Leicester Tigers, which enabled him to get game time in the Championship. He made five appearances for the Tigers first team in 2009–10, notably against London Irish.

Green's Tigers debut match was a friendly against the Classic All Blacks in 2008. Despite not yet being 20, Green also played for the Leicester Tigers side in their 2009 friendly against  at Welford Road, which the Tigers won 22–17. His first league appearance was a home win against Saracens in March 2009.  Green was a member of the Anglo-Welsh Cup winning squad in 2011/12.

Green then joined Yorkshire Carnegie for the 2012/13 season on a two-year contract. On 7 April 2014, Green rejoined the Aviva Premiership as he agreed a deal to join Newcastle Falcons from the 2014-15 season.

On 22 April 2019 it was announced that Green was to re-join Leicester that summer, with his signing being welcomed by new team mate Dan Cole.

Green started the 2022 Premiership Rugby final as Tigers beat Saracens 15-12.

International career
Green has represented England U16A, and England U20, in the 6 Nations and IRB Junior World Championship, where England came fourth.

References

External links
 Leicester profile
 England U20 profile
 Premiership profile

1990 births
Living people
English rugby union players
Leicester Tigers players
Newcastle Falcons players
Nottingham R.F.C. players
Rugby union locks
Rugby union players from Norwich